Carthagena Lock (No7) is a lock on the River Lee Navigation at Broxbourne

Location 
Directly behind the lock is Carthagena Weir part of a fishery which also includes two lakes and a section of the Old River Lea. 

To the east of the lock is the Nazeing Mead complex of lakes which incorporate part of the River Lee Flood Relief Channel.

Public access 
Vehicular access via B194 Nazeing New Road

Pedestrian and cycle access via the towpath which forms part of the Lea Valley Walk

There is a water point for boats. The tap is in the lock.

Public transport 
 Broxbourne railway station

External links 
 Carthagena fisheries
 Nazeing Meads lakes
 Carthagena Lock- a history

Locks in Hertfordshire
Locks in Essex
Locks of the Lee Navigation